Phorusrhacids, colloquially known as terror birds, are an extinct clade of large carnivorous flightless birds that were one of the largest species of apex predators in South America during the Cenozoic era; their conventionally accepted temporal range covers from 62 to 0.1 million years (Ma) ago.

Their closest modern-day relatives are believed to be the  seriemas. Titanis walleri, one of the larger species, is known from Texas and Florida in North America. This makes the phorusrhacids the only known large South American predator to migrate north in the Great American Interchange that followed the formation of the Isthmus of Panama land bridge (the main pulse of the interchange began about 2.6 Ma ago; Titanis at 5 Ma was an early northward migrant).

It was once believed that T. walleri became extinct in North America around the time of the arrival of humans, but subsequent datings of Titanis fossils provided no evidence for their survival after 1.8 Ma. However, reports from Uruguay of new findings of a relatively small form (Psilopterus) dating to 18,000 and 96,000 years ago would imply that phorusrhacids survived there until very recently (i.e., until the late Pleistocene); the initial report of such a recent date has been questioned.

Phorusrhacids may have even made their way into Africa; the genus Lavocatavis was discovered in Algeria, but its status as a true phorusrhacid is questioned. A possible European form, Eleutherornis, has also been identified, suggesting that this group had a wider geographical range in the Paleogene.

The closely related bathornithids occupied a similar ecological niche in North America across the Eocene to Early Miocene; some, like Paracrax, were similar in size to the largest phorusrhacids. At least one analysis recovers Bathornis as sister taxa to phorusrhacids, on the basis of shared features in the jaws and coracoid, though this has been seriously contested, as these might have evolved independently for the same carnivorous, flightless lifestyle.

Description 

The neck can be divided into three main regions. In the higher regions of the neck, the phorusrhacid has bifurcate neural spines (BNS), while it has high neural spines in its lower regions. This suggests that the phorusrhacid had a highly flexible and developed neck allowing it to carry its heavy head and strike with terrifying speed and power. Although the phorusrhacid externally looks like it has a short neck, its flexible skeletal neck structure proves that it could expand farther beyond the expected reach and intimidate its prey using its height, allowing it to strike more easily. Once stretched out into its full length in preparation for a downward strike, its developed neck muscles and heavy head could produce enough momentum and power to cause fatal damage to the terror bird's prey.

Kelenken guillermoi, from the Langhian stage of the Miocene epoch, some 15 million years ago, discovered in the Collón Curá Formation in Patagonia in 2006, represents the largest bird skull yet found. Examination of phorusrhacid habitats also indicates that phorusrhacids may have presented intense competition to predatory metatherian sparassodonts such as borhyaenids and thylacosmilids, causing the mammalian predators to choose forested habitats to avoid the more successful and aggressive avian predators on the open plains.

The feet of the phorusrhacids had four toes, the first of which, known as the hallux, was reduced and did not touch the ground, while the others, corresponding to the second, third and fourth toes, were kept on the ground. Analysis of the resistance of the toes based on biomechanical models of curved beams, in particular of the second toe and its nail claw, indicate that its was modified into a "sickle claw" and was relatively uniform in various species and said claw would be relatively curved and large, which implies the need to keep it elevated to avoid wear or breakage due to contact with the ground, which would be achieved with a well-developed extensor tubercle and soft tissue pads on the fingers. The second toe, which was shorter and had fewer phalanges, also had more resistance and would make it easier to hold the claw off the ground and retain prey, a compromise with its predatory function and movement on the run, as occurs with modern seriemas, although to a lesser degree of specialization than dromaeosaurid dinosaurs.

Palaeobiology 

Most phorusrhacids were very fast runners. All members possessed a large, sharp beak, a powerful neck and sharp talons. However, even with these attributes, the phorusrhacids are often assumed to have preyed on relatively small animals (about the size of a rabbit) that could be dispatched with a minimum of struggle. This is because with the phorusrhacids' beak proportions, the jaw could not generate a great deal of bite force with which to kill the prey. This is disputable as many big-game hunting predators such as Smilodon, great white sharks and Allosaurus have weaker bite forces and often laterally weak skulls as adaptations towards, not away from, killing large prey, relying instead on the presence of a cutting edge, a wide gape made possible by the reduction of jaw musculature, and the driving force of the body or neck. Since phorusrhacids share many of the same adaptations, such as a large, laterally flattened skull with a sharp-edged beak and powerful neck musculature, it is possible that they were specialized predators of relatively large prey.

The bones of the beak were tightly fused together, making the beak more resilient to force from the front to back direction, thus suggesting that it could cause a great amount of harm through pecking as opposed to side-to-side head movements like shaking prey. Generally speaking, it is thought that a terror bird would use its feet to injure prey by kicking it, and to hold the prey down and dispatch by pecking at it with its large beak. Larger prey may also have been attacked by pecking and kicking, or by using the beak as a blade to strike at or slash vital organs.

It has been recently shown that at least some phorusrhacids like Andalgalornis, while very fast runners in a straight line, were poor at tight turns at speed, which contradicts the idea of phorusrhacids being agile predators of small prey.

Diet 
All phorusrhacids are thought to have been carnivorous. The strong downwards curve from the tip of this beak suggests that it ripped the flesh from the body of other animals; many extant bird species with this feature are carnivorous. CT scans performed on the skull of a phorusrhacid reveal that the species would not have been able to shake its prey side to side, but rather exert significant downward force. Florentino Ameghino claimed in a letter to Édouard Trouessart that he had specimens from Argentina of "petrified masses preserving skeletons of large rodents, Interatheriidae [small notoungulates] and even Proterotheriidae [deer-sized litopterns], with all their bones crushed and corroded, piled on with no apparent order and forming a nearly spherical mass with the skull in the center" that resembled giant owl pellets, suggesting that phorusrhacids may have swallowed their prey whole and regurgitated the indigestible parts similar to owls. However, Ameghino never formally described these specimens and they have not yet been relocated, making it difficult to determine if they are phorusrhacid pellets. Fossilized pellets from northwestern Argentina have also been suggested to pertain to small phorusrhacids like Procariama.

Extinction 
During the Miocene and early Pliocene epochs, there was an increase in the phorusrhacid population size in South America, suggesting that, in that time frame, the various species flourished as predators in the savanna environment.

With the emergence of the Isthmus of Panama 2.7 million years ago, carnivorous dogs, bears, and cats from North America were able to cross into South America, increasing competition. (They had been preceded by procyonids as early as 7.3 million years ago.) The population of phorusrhacids declined thereafter according to older hypotheses, suggesting that competition with newly arrived predators was a major contributor to their extinction. Similar ideas have been considered for sparassodonts and for South America's terrestrial sebecid crocodilians.

However, the role of competitive displacement in South American predator lineages has been questioned by some researchers. The timing of turnover events and the decline of South American predators do not correlate well with the arrival of large carnivores like canids or sabretooths (although they do correlate well with the earlier-arriving procyonids, which evolved to large body size in South America, but these were omnivorous), with native South American predator lineages (including most phorusrhacids and all sparassodonts and sebecids) dying out well before the arrival of most larger placental carnivores. Bathornithids, which were similar in ecology and are likely close relatives of phorusrhacids, existed entirely within North America during part of the Cenozoic and competed successfully for a time with large carnivorans such as nimravids, before becoming extinct in the Early Miocene, about 20 million years ago. The phorusrhacid Titanis expanded northward into a southern North America during the Interchange and coexisted for several million years with large canids and big cats like Xenosmilus, before its extinction about 1.8 million years ago.

There were some suggestions that phorusrhacids, like the majority of Pleistocene megafauna, were killed off by human activity such as hunting or habitat change. This idea is no longer considered valid, as improved dating on Titanis specimens show that the last phorusrhacids went extinct over one million years before humans arrived. However, several fossil finds of smaller forms have been described from the late Pleistocene of South America. Psilopterus may have been present until 96,040 ± 6,300 years ago. Another unidentified smaller type has also been dated to the late Pleistocene, perhaps 18,000 years ago. These finds, if accepted, extend the existence of the smaller members of this group of avian predators considerably.

Recent skull discoveries 

In the past, these birds were thought to have high beaks, round orbits, and vaulted braincases though there was never enough empirical evidence to support this. However, new fossils have been discovered in Comallo, Argentina. These skulls reveal that the terror bird has a triangular dorsal view, a rostrum that is hooked and more than half the length of the actual skull, and a more compact caudal portion. The external nares and antorbital fenestras (areas found in the nose) were found to be more square than triangular. These all contribute to a skull that is more rectangular in view rather than triangular. The structure of the fossils also suggest that these birds may have been swifter than originally thought.

A skull from a smaller subspecies of this bird was also found recently. With this fossil, it was found that the internal structure of the beak is hollow and reinforced with thin-walled trabeculae. There is also an absence of both zona flexoria palatina and zona flexoria arcus jugalis, which are key features that relate to the evolution of cranial akinesis. The discovery of this skull allows for the establishment of primary osteological homologies, which are useful in comparative anatomy, functional morphology, and phylogenetic studies.

Classification 
The etymology of the name Phorusrhacidae is based on the type genus Phorusrhacos. When first described by Florentino Ameghino in 1887, the etymology of Phorusrhacos was not given. Current thinking is that the name is derived from a combination of the Greek words "phoros", which means bearer or bearing, and "rhakos", which translates to wrinkles, scars or rents. Researchers have compared Phorusrhacidae with the living families of Cariamidae and Sagittariidae, but their differences in body mass are too drastic and, thus, one cannot overly depend on these living families for answers.

Following the revision by Alvarenga and Höfling (2003), there are now 5 subfamilies, containing 14 genera and 18 species: These species were the product of adaptive radiation.

Superfamily Phorusrhacoidea
 Genus Lavocatavis – Middle Eocene Glib Zegdou Formation of Algeria

Family Phorusrhacidae
 Genus Patagorhacos – Early Miocene Chichinales Formation of Rio Negro Province, Argentina.
Placement in Phorusrhacidae and/or monophyly disputed.
 Genus Brontornis (Early to Middle Miocene (Santacrucian-Laventan) Santa Cruz and Monte León Formations, Argentina)
 Genus Paraphysornis (Late Oligocene to Early Miocene (Deseadan) Tremembé Formation of São Paulo State, Brazil)
 Genus Physornis (Middle to Late Oligocene (Deseadan) Sarmiento Formation of Santa Cruz Province, Argentina)
 Genus Devincenzia (Late Oligocene to Early Miocene (Deseadan) Fray Bentos Formation of Uruguay)
 Genus Kelenken (Middle Miocene (Colloncuran) Collón Curá Formation of Río Negro Province, Argentina; largest known phorusrhacid)
 Genus Phorusrhacos (Early to Middle Miocene (Santacrucian) Santa Cruz Formation of Argentina)
 Genus Titanis (Early Pliocene to Early Pleistocene (Blancan) of Florida and Texas)
 Genus Patagornis (Early to Middle Miocene (Santacrucian-Laventan) Santa Cruz Formation of Santa Cruz Province, Argentina) – includes Morenomerceraria, Palaeociconia, Tolmodus
 Genus Andrewsornis (Middle to Late Oligocene (Deseadan) Agua de la Piedra Formation of southern Argentina)
 Genus Andalgalornis (Late Miocene to Early Pliocene (Huayquerian) Ituzaingó Formation of northwestern Argentina)
 Genus Eleutherornis (Middle Eocene (Bartonian) of Rhône, France and Baselland, Switzerland)
 Genus ?Paleopsilopterus (Lower Eocene (Itaboraian) Itaboraí Formation of Itaboraí, Brazil) (identity as a phorusrhacid dubious)
 Genus Psilopterus (Middle Oligocene (Deseadan) Santa Cruz Formation and Late Miocene (Chasicoan) Arroyo Chasicó Formation of southern and eastern Argentina respectively) (Possible Late Pleistocene (Lujanian) records from Uruguay)
 Genus Mesembriornis (Late Miocene to Late Pliocene (Montehermosan) Monte Hermoso Formation of Argentina)
 Genus Procariama (Late Miocene to Early Pliocene (Huayquerian-Montehermosan) Cerro Azul and Andalhualá Formations of Catamarca Province, Argentina)
 Genus Llallawavis (Late Pliocene (Chapadmalalan) Playa Los Lobos Allo Formation of northeastern Argentina)

Alvarenga and Höfling did not include the Ameghinornithidae from Europe in the phorusrhacoids; these have meanwhile turned out to be more basal members of Cariamae. Though traditionally considered as members of the Gruiformes, based on both morphological and genetic studies (the latter being based on the seriema) Cariamiformes may belong to a separate group of birds, Australaves, and their closest living relatives, according to nuclear sequence studies, are a clade consisting of Falconidae, Psittaciformes and Passeriformes.

The following cladogram follows the analysis of Degrange and colleagues, 2015:

References

External links 

 Hooper Museum
 Terror Birds: Bigger and Faster (Science)
 Darren Naish: Tetrapod Zoology: "terror birds"
 Darren Naish: Tetrapod Zoology: "Raven, the claw-handed bird, last of the phorusrhacids" includes links to other articles on phorusrhacids

 
Extinct flightless birds
Danian first appearances
Pleistocene extinctions
Apex predators
Cenozoic birds of South America
Taxa named by Florentino Ameghino
Prehistoric bird families